Stenaelurillus latibulbis is  a species of jumping spider in the genus Stenaelurillus that lives in Democratic Republic of the Congo and Zambia. It was first described in 2014 by Wanda Wesołowska. The male carapace has patches of white hairs, while the female is marked by two white stripes that stretch from the front to back. The female abdomen has a triangular-shaped white marking. It is distinguished from other members of the genus by the male's short, wide palpal bulb and the female's small epigyne.

Taxonomy
Stenaelurillus latibulbis was first described by Wanda Wesołowska in 2014. It is one of over 500 species identified by the Polish arachnologist. It was placed in the genus Stenaelurillus, first raised by Eugène Simon in 1885. The name relates to the genus name Aelurillus, which itself derives from the Greek word for cat, with the addition of a Greek stem meaning narrow. In 2017, it was grouped with nine other genera of jumping spiders under the name Aelurillines. It has been placed in the subtribe Aelurillina in the tribe Aelurillini in the clade Saltafresia. The species name recalls the shape of the palpal bulb.

Description
The spider is medium-sized. The dark brown pear-shaped carapace has a scattering of white hairs. The spinnerets are long and black, and the legs are brown. The pedipalps are also brown and hairy. It can be distinguished from other members of the genus by its wide and relatively short palpal bulb, and the fact that the embolus is almost completely hidden.

The female is very similar to the male in colouration and shape. The carapace is also pear-shaped and dark brown, but has two white streaks that extend from the front to back. The abdomen has a wide white marking in the shape of a triangle and two white patches on the rear half. The spinnerets are brown-yellow. The epigyne is small, with large copulatory openings. The epigyne distinguishes the species from the otherwise similar Stenaelurillus kavango but has shorter insemination ducts and round spermathecae.

Distribution and habitat
The species was first identified in Democratic Republic of the Congo based on examples found in Katanga Province in 1974. It was also found in Luambe National Park in Zambia. It prefers to live in savanna.

References

Citations

Bibliography

Arthropods of the Democratic Republic of the Congo
Invertebrates of Zambia
Salticidae
Spiders described in 2014
Spiders of Africa
Taxa named by Wanda Wesołowska